Didymus is a genus of beetles known as weevils (insects in the family Curculionidae). The genus contains the following species:
 Didymus bicostatus
 Didymus erroneous
 Didymus impexus
 Didymus intutus
 Didymus metrosideri
 Didymus setosus

The type species for this genus is Acalles intutus Pascoe, 1876 by original designation. 
Species from this genus are found in New Zealand, the Kermadec and the Norfolk Islands.

References

Curculionidae genera
Cryptorhynchinae
Beetles of New Zealand